Marvin Alex Dunphy is an American former volleyball player and head coach. He is most known for his time at Pepperdine University.  During his tenure, Pepperdine won five NCAA Division I Championships. His career record is 507–199 (.708).

Pepperdine career 

Dunphy began his career at Pepperdine as an assistant coach in 1975, and assumed the head coaching role in 1977.  Under his tutelage, 19 Pepperdine Waves have earned 34 All-American awards, and nine of his players have earned National Player of the Year honors: Bob Ctvrtlik (1985), George Roumain (1998, 1999), Brad Keenan (2002, 2003), Sean Rooney (2005), Jonathan Winder (2007) and Paul Carroll (2009)... more than any other program in the United States.  Ten of Dunphy's players have gone on to compete in the Olympics.

National career 

In 1985, Dunphy became the head coach of the USA Men's National Team.  His team experienced unprecedented success as the Americans maintained a number one ranking and compiled an impressive overall record of 197–31.  Dunphy's squad won every major international event, including the 1985 World Cup, the 1986 World Championships, the 1987 Pan American Games, and the 1988 Olympics in Seoul, Korea.  In 1988, Dunphy was the recipient of the Coach of the Year Award from the Fédération Internationale de Volleyball (FIVB).  He served as the technical advisor for the 1996 and 2004 Olympic teams, was as assistant coach for the 2000 Olympic team, and most recently was a consultant coach at the 2008 Olympics.

Hall of Fame 

Dunphy is a member of the Volleyball Hall of Fame and the American Volleyball Coaches Association Hall of Fame.  His 1988 Olympic Team was also inducted into the Volleyball Hall of Fame.

Education 

Dunphy earned an undergraduate degree from Pepperdine University, has a master's degree from the University of Southern California, and completed his doctorate at Brigham Young University.  In addition to his coaching responsibilities, Dunphy also teaches in the Natural Science Division at Pepperdine University.

References

External links 
 Pepperdine Sports website

American volleyball coaches
Living people
Pepperdine University alumni
University of Southern California alumni
Brigham Young University alumni
Year of birth missing (living people)